Western Australia has relatively few species of moss; the most recent census found just 192 taxa. This represents just 10% of Australia's total moss flora, even though Western Australia accounts for about one third of the Australia by area. This relatively low diversity has been attributed to the lack of rainforest in the state.

By far the majority of the state's moss species occur in the Southwest Botanical Province, with over 80% of all species, genera and families occurring there. This includes four species that are apparently endemic to the province.

About 70% of Western Australia's moss taxa occur also in South Australia, and a similar proportion occur also in New South Wales. Only about 50% occur also in Queensland. About half are restricted to Australia, New Zealand and South Africa, and a further 10% occur also only in South America.

List of mosses of Western Australia
This is a list of mosses of Western Australia, with classification updated.

Subclass Sphagnidae

Sphagnaceae
 Sphagnum molliculum

Subclass Funariidae

Encalyptaceae
 Bryobartramia novae-valesiae

Funariaceae
 Funaria apophysata
 F. cuspidata
 F. gracilis
 F. helmsii
 F. hygrometrica
 F. muhlenbergii
 F. phymatodea
 F. producta
 F. radians
 F. salsicola
 F. subnuda
 Goniomitrium acuminatum
 G. enerve

Gigaspermaceae
 Gigaspermum repens

Subclass Dicranidae

Grimmiaceae
 Grimmia apocarpa
 G. laevigata
 G. pulvinata
 G. trichophylla
 Racomitrium crispulum

Ptychomitriaceae
 Ptychomitrium australe

Archidiaceae
 Archidium indicum
 A. rehmanii
 A. rothii

Fissidentaceae
 Fissidens asplenioides
 F. bifrons
 F. ceylonensis
 F. gillianus
 F. gymnocarpus
 F. hebetatus
 F. leptocladus
 F. maceratus
 F. megalotis
 F.  microcladus
 F. perobtusus
 F. pungens
 F. taylorii
 F. tenellus
 F. victorialis

Ditrichaceae
 Ceratodon purpureus
 Ditrichum difficile
 Eccremidium arcuatum
 E. exiguum
 E. minutum
 E. pulchellum
 E. whiteleggei
 Pleuridium acuminatum
 P. ecklonii
 P. nervosum

Bruchiaceae
 Bruchia brevipes
 Tremadoton acutus

Dicranaceae
 Campylopus acuminatus
 C. australis
 C. bicolor
 C. flindersii
 C. incrassatus
 C. introflexus
 C. pyriformis
 Dicranoloma billardieri
 D. diaphanoneurum

Leucobryaceae
 Leucobryum subchlorophyllosum

Erpodiaceae
 Erpodium australiense

Calymperaceae
 Calymperes erosum
 Calymperes tenerum
 Octoblepharum albidum

Pottiaceae
Note: The genera Desmatodon, Phascum, Pottia, and Tortula were heavily revised by Zander, and a number of names in the list below are no longer correct.
 Acaulon eremicola
 A. granulosum
 A. integrifolium
 A. leucochaete
 A. mediterraneum
 A. triquetrum
 Aloina sullivaniana
 Barbula calycina
 B. crinita
 B. ehrenbergii
 B. hornschuchiana
 B. indica
 B. luteola
 B. subcalycina
 Bryoerythrophyllum binnsii
 Calymperastrum latifolium
 Crossidium davidai
 C. geheebii
 D. recurvatus
 Didymodon luehmannii
 D. subtorquatus
 D. torquatus
 Gymnostomiella vernicosa
 Gymnostomum calcareum
 Hyophila involuta
 H. rosea
 Leptodontium paradoxum
 Phasconica balansae
 Phascopsis rubicunda
 Phascum laticostum
 P. longipilum
 P. robustum var. crassinervium
 Pottia brevicaulis
 P. davalliana
 P. drummondii
 P. scabrifolia
 P. starckeana
 Pterygoneurum kemsleyi
 P. ovatum
 Splachnobryum wiemansii
 Stonea oleaginosa
 Tetrapterum cylindricum
 Tortella cirrhata
 T. flavovirens
 Tortula antarctica
 T. atrovirens (=Desmatodon convolutus)
 T. muralis
 T. pagorum
 T. papillosa
 T. rubella
 Trichostomopsis australasiae
 Trichostomum brachydontium
 Triquetrella papillata
 Uleobryum peruvianum
 Weissia brachycarpa
 W. controversa
 W. rutilans

Rhabdoweisiaceae
 Amphidium cyathicarpum

Ephemeraceae
 Ephemerum cristatum
 E. rehmannii

Subclass Bryidae

Splachnaceae
 Tayloria octoblepharum

Orthotrichaceae
 Macromitrium archeri
 Zygodon intermedius
 Z. menziesii
 Z. minutus

Hedwigiaceae
 Hedwigia ciliata
 H. integrifolia

Rhacocarpaceae
 Rhacocarpus purpurascens
 R. webbianus

Bryaceae
 Brachymenium coarctatum
 B. exile
 B. indicum
 B. preissianum
 Bryum albo-limbatum
 B. apiculatum
 B. argenteum
 B. australe
 B. billardieri var. billardieri
 B. billardieri var. platyloma
 B. caespiticium
 B. campylothecium
 B. capillare
 B. cellulare
 B. cheelii
 B. chrysoneuron
 B. creberrimum
 B. dichotomum
 B. inaequale
 B. lanatum
 B. pachytheca
 B. torquescens
 Pleurophascum occidentale

Orthodontiaceae
 Orthodontium inflatum
 O. lineare
 O. pallens

Mniaceae
 Pohlia wahlenbergii
 Schizymenium bryoides

Bartramiaceae
 Bartramia afro-stricta
 B. compacta
 B. hampei
 B. papillata
 B. pseudostricta
 B. strictifolia
 Breutelia affinis
 Philonotis australiensis (= Bartramidula pusilla; The genus Bartramidula has been synonymized with Philonotis.)
 P. mollis
 P. tenuis

Racopilaceae
 Racopilum convolutaceum

Mitteniaceae
 Mittenia plumula

Pilotrichaceae
 Sauloma tenella

Pterigynandraceae
 Trachyphyllum inflexus

Thuidiaceae
 Thuidium sparsum var. hastatum

Campyliaceae
 Drepanocladus aduncus
 D. sendtneri

Fabroniaceae
 Fabronia australis
 F. hampeana
 Ischyrodon lepturus

Hypnaceae
 Hypnum cupressiforme var. mossmanianum
 Taxiphyllum minutirameum
 Vesicularia montagnei
 V. rivalis

Sematophyllaceae
 Sematophyllum amoenum
 S. caespitosum
 S. contiguum
 S. homomallum

References

Western Australia
Lists of plants of Australia
Lists of biota of Western Australia
Flora of Western Australia